Maria Fernanda Cândido (born May 21, 1974) is a Brazilian actress, television presenter, and former model.

Biography 

Maria Fernanda Cândido lived in Curitiba from the age of four to twelve, when she moved to São Paulo with her family. Her parents, José Reginaldo and Agda, were merchants.

Once in São Paulo she was enrolled in the prestigious Colégio São Luiz, in São Paulo, where she proved to be a good student. At 14, she began to career as a professional model after being discovered by one of her neighbours, who was a fashion producer. She modelled for fashion publications, magazine covers and campaigns for famous brands. At age 15, during school summer breaks, she travelled to Paris to work. In total, she spent five years juggling school, fashion shows and photo shoots. After finishing high school, she lived in New York City for six months and, before returning to Brazil, went to the French capital for another season of runway shows. She always caused a good impression on her co-workers  due to her punctuality and discipline regarding schedules. More than a year living abroad was enough for her to decide to put an end to her international modelling career.

Back in Brazil, she applied for, and was accepted at USP where she studied Occupational Therapy, and course the full-time programme for three years before dropping out to join MTV working as a VJ hosting the show "Ilha do Biquini" (Bikini Island).  After shooting the pilot, unhappy with the outcome, she sought technical improvement in a studio in São Paulo. As a result of  that experience, she discovered her talent for on-camera work. She formally withdrew from college to study vocal technique with Fátima Toledo, a famous speech therapist, in order to focus on acting for the cinema.

Real success came in 1999. After sending a videobook to TV director Jayme Monjardim, of Rede Globo, she was invited to audition and soon joined the cast of Terra Nostra soap-opera in the role of an Italian young woman, Paola. For that job, she hired a dialect coach in order to improve her Italian pronunciation. The role led to her winning the prestigious Troféu Imprensa and in 2000 she was voted the most beautiful woman of the century in a poll conducted by Fantástico a Sunday evening TV show. At the time, she was compared to the young Sophia Loren, the Italian legend, paralleling the latter's beauty and talent. Like her character in the soap-opera, Cândido's great-grandmother, arrived in Brazil around 1880. The actress is a descendant of the Bortolacci and Malvezi families on her mother's side and the Guiraldelli on her father's side, both coming from Venice, northern Italy. "The funny thing is that I go by the Cândido family name, highlighting the only part of my heritage that is actually Brazilian," she stresses. Another coincidence between her own family's history and the soap-opera, is that her family settled in the same area where the plot was set, the Oeste Paulista, the western region of the State of São Paulo. The character is also the daughter of Italian Anacleto, who works on a coffee farm, the same occupation of her great-grandparents when they arrived in Brazil. As part of her research to play Paola, she watched films such as Bicycle Thieves, Marriage Italian-Style and The Gold of Naples, and to better understand the context in which her character would have lived, she also watched 1900, Bernardo Bertolucci.

In 2003, she debuted as a cinema actress in the movie Dom and won the Kikito Award for Best Actress at the Festival de Gramado.

In 2008, she was chosen to be the face of Orient Watches' new marketing campaign during the first half of the year. Cândido was the star in two campaigns for the launching of the company's then new collection, which were broadcast over the months of April, May and June. The female models of Orient were chosen to reflect major global trends.

Filmography

Film

Television

Theatre

References

External links 

 

1974 births
Living people
People from Londrina
Brazilian people of Italian descent
Brazilian film actresses
Brazilian telenovela actresses
Brazilian stage actresses